Dioxyna peregrina is a species of fruit fly in the genus Dioxyna of the family Tephritidae.

Distribution
These flies live in Brazil.

References

Tephritinae
Insects described in 1873
Diptera of South America